The following is a list of media in Atlanta, Georgia, United States.

Print

Daily 

The Atlanta Journal-Constitution
Atlanta Voice
Fulton County Daily Report

Weekly 
Atlanta Business Chronicle
Atlanta Inquirer
The Atlanta Jewish Times
The Emory Wheel
The Signal
The Technique

Monthly 

Creative Loafing
Barbershop Digest
The Southerner

Suburban 
Acción Deportes
Gwinnett Daily Post
Marietta Daily Journal
El Nuevo Georgia

Defunct 
Atlanta Constitution
Atlanta Georgian
Atlanta Journal
Atlanta Southern Confederacy
Daily Examiner
Daily Intelligencer
The Great Speckled Bird
Southern Voice
The Sunny South

Magazines
Art Papers
Atlanta
Atlanta History
Atlanta Review
Azizah Magazine
Barbershop Digest
David Atlanta
FENUXE
Jezebel
Wussy Magazine

Broadcast radio
The Atlanta metropolitan area is currently the ninth-largest radio market in the United States as ranked by Nielsen Media Research. The following list includes full-power stations licensed to Atlanta proper, in addition to area suburbs.

Currently, radio stations that primarily serve the Atlanta metropolitan area include:

AM stations
 590 WDWD Atlanta (Christian)
 610 WPLO Grayson (Regional Mexican)
 640 WBIN Atlanta (Black Information Network)
 680 WCNN Atlanta (Sports)
 750 WSB Atlanta (Talk)1
 790 WQXI Atlanta (Korean)
 860 WAEC Atlanta (Christian)
 920 WGKA Atlanta (Conservative talk)
 970 WNIV Atlanta (Christian)
 1010 WTZA Atlanta (South Asian)
 1100 WWWE Hapeville (Brokered)2
 1160 WCFO East Point (Catholic-EWTN)
 1190 WAFS Atlanta (Relevant Radio)2
 1230 WFOM Marietta (Conservative talk)
 1310 WJZA Decatur (Smooth jazz)
 1340 WIFN Atlanta (Sports)
 1380 WAOK Atlanta (Urban talk)
 1400 WLTA Alpharetta (Christian)
 1400 WRZX Newnan (Sports)
 1410 WKKP McDonough (Classic country)
 1420 WWSZ Decatur (Urban contemporary)
 1430 WYKG Covington (Gospel)
 1450 WBHF Cartersville (Adult standards/talk/sports)
 1460 WXEM Buford (Regional Mexican)
 1480 WYZE Atlanta (Gospel)
 1500 WDPC Dallas (Christian)2
 1520 WDCY Douglasville (Christian)2
 1550 WAZX Smyrna (Oldies)
 1570 WIGO Morrow (Gospel)
 1600 WAOS Austell (Regional Mexican)
 1690 WMLB Avondale Estates (Conservative talk)
 1 clear-channel station
 2 daytime-only station

FM stations
Asterisk (*) indicates a non-commercial (public radio/campus/educational) broadcast.
 88.5 WRAS Atlanta (College/NPR/GPB)*
 89.1 WBCX Gainesville (College/variety)*
 89.3 WRFG Atlanta (College/freeform)*
 90.1 WABE Atlanta (NPR/classical)*
 90.5 WUWG Carrollton (NPR/GPB)*
 90.7 WUOG Athens (College/freeform)*
 91.1 WREK Atlanta (College/freeform)*
 91.5 WWEV-FM Cumming (Christian)*
 91.7 WUGA Athens (NPR/GPB)*
 91.7 WCCV Cartersville (Christian)*
 91.9 WCLK Atlanta (NPR/jazz)*
 92.9 WZGC Atlanta (Sports)
 93.3 WVFJ-FM Greenville (Contemporary Christian)*
 94.1 WSTR Smyrna (Rhythmic AC)
 94.9 WUBL Atlanta (Country)
 95.5 WSBB-FM Doraville (Talk)
 96.1 WWPW Atlanta (Contemporary hit radio)
 96.7 WBZW Union City (Spanish contemporary)
 97.1 WSRV Gainesville (Classic hits)
 97.5 WUMJ Fayetteville (Urban AC)
 98.5 WSB-FM Atlanta (Adult contemporary)
 99.1 WIEH-LP Marietta (LPFM/Brazilian Portuguese Christian)*
 99.3 WCON-FM Cornelia (Classic country)
 99.7 WWWQ Atlanta (Contemporary hit radio)
 100.1 WNSY Talking Rock (Regional Mexican)
 100.5 WNNX College Park (Mainstream rock)
 101.5 WKHX-FM Marietta (Country)
 102.3 WLKQ-FM Buford (Regional Mexican)
 102.5 WPZE Mableton (Gospel)
 103.3 WVEE Atlanta (Urban contemporary)
 103.7 WPCG-LP Canton (LPFM/Christian)*
 104.1 WALR-FM Palmetto (Urban AC)
 104.7 WFSH-FM Athens (Contemporary Christian)
 105.3 WRDG Bowdon (Urban contemporary)
 105.7 WBZY Canton (Spanish contemporary)
 106.7 WAKL Gainesville (K-Love)*
 107.1 WTSH-FM Rockmart (Regional Mexican)
 107.5 WAMJ Roswell (Urban AC)
 107.9 WHTA Hampton (Mainstream urban)

Defunct 
 WGHR/Marietta (1981–2004)
 WGM/Atlanta (1922–23)
 WHIE/Griffin (1954–2020)
 WMLB/Cumming (1961–2003)
 WSB-FM (104.5)/Atlanta (1948–52)
 WTJH/East Point (1950–2010)

Television 

The Atlanta metropolitan area is currently defined by Nielsen Media Research as the seventh-largest television market in the United States, with all of the major U.S. television networks having affiliates serving the region.

Atlanta is a major cable television programming center. Ted Turner began the Turner Broadcasting System in Atlanta in 1970 with his takeover of WJRJ-TV, renamed WTCG in 1970 and WTBS in 1979; WTBS became a pioneer "superstation" distributed to cable operators internationally, eventually yielding TBS. Ted established CNN in 1980, long headquartered at the CNN Center. Most of Turner's other networks—including Cartoon Network/Adult Swim, Boomerang, TNT, Turner Sports, Turner Classic Movies, HLN and CNN International—continue to be based in Atlanta. The Weather Channel has its offices and studios in nearby Cumberland. The first nationwide music video programming on cable television, Video Concert Hall, was created in Atlanta.

Currently, television stations that primarily serve the Atlanta metropolitan area include:

Broadcast 
2 WSB-TV Atlanta (ABC)
4 WUVM-LD Atlanta (Estrella TV)
5 WAGA-TV Atlanta (Fox)*
6 WTBS-LD Atlanta (Estrella TV)
8 WGTV Athens (PBS-GPB)
11 WXIA-TV Atlanta (NBC)
14 WPXA-TV Rome (Ion Television)*
16 WYGA-CD Atlanta (BeIN Sports)
17 WPCH-TV Atlanta (Independent)
22 WSKC-CD Atlanta (KBS World)
28 WDWW-LD Cleveland (CBN News)
29 WANN-CD Atlanta (Independent)
30 WABE-TV Atlanta (PBS)
34 WUVG-DT Athens (Univision)*
35 WDTA-LD Atlanta (Daystar)*
36 WATL Atlanta (MyNetworkTV)
40 WIRE-CD Atlanta (Infomercials)
42 WTHC-LD Atlanta (Tourism info)
45 W13DQ-D Atlanta (HSN)
46 WANF Atlanta (CBS)
47 WKTB-CD Norcross (Telemundo)
57 WATC-DT Atlanta (Independent)
63 WHSG-TV Monroe (TBN)*
69 WUPA Atlanta (The CW)
Asterisk (*) indicates channel is a network owned-and-operated station.

Cable
Atlanta Interfaith Broadcasters
Bally Sports South
Bally Sports Southeast
CobbTV
Cobb edTV

Internet

Publishing 
Atlanta Daily World
Patch

Radio 
WMRE

See also

List of Atlanta broadcast stations by location
 Georgia media
 List of newspapers in Georgia (U.S. state)
 List of radio stations in Georgia (U.S. state)
 List of television stations in Georgia (U.S. state)
 Media of cities in Georgia: Athens, Augusta, Columbus, Macon, Savannah

References

External links
Atlanta Historic Newspapers Archive Digital Library of Georgia
Southern Israelite Archive Digital Library of Georgia
 

 
Atlanta